Yugoslavia was represented at the Eurovision Song Contest 1969, held in Madrid, Spain, by an act that ended in 13th place.

Before Eurovision

Jugovizija 1969 
The Yugoslav national final to select their entry, was held on 15 February at the RTV Zagreb Studios in Zagreb. The host was Oliver Mlakar. There were 17 songs in the final, from six subnational public broadcasters. The winner was chosen by the votes of a mixed jury of experts and citizens, one juror from each of the subnational public broadcasters of  JRT, and three non-experts - citizens. The winning song was "Pozdrav svijetu" performed by the Croatian group 4M, written and composed by Milan Lentić.

At Eurovision
Because groups weren't allowed at the ESC, 4M renamed themselves to Ivan & 3M. 4M performed 1st on the night of the Contest, preceding Luxembourg. At the close of the voting the song had received 5 points, coming 13th in the field of 16 competing countries.

Voting

Notes

References

External links
Eurodalmatia official ESC club
Eurovision Song Contest National Finals' Homepage
Eurovision France
ECSSerbia.com
OGAE North Macedonia

1969
Countries in the Eurovision Song Contest 1969
Eurovision